Diaye Coura is a small town and commune in the Cercle of Nioro in the Kayes Region of western Mali.

References

External links
.

Communes of Kayes Region